Milovanović is a Serbian surname derived from a masculine given name Milovan, and may refer to:
Danijel Milovanović, Swedish footballer
Dejan Milovanović, Serbian footballer
Đorđe Milovanović, Serbian footballer, nicknamed "Đoka Bomba"
Marko Milovanović (footballer, born 1982), Serbian footballer
Marko Milovanović (footballer, born 2003), Serbian footballer
Mladen Milovanović, Serb State President in the  19th century
Rade Milovanović (born 1954), Bosnian and American chess master
Uroš Milovanović, Serbian footballer
Vladan Milovanović, Serbian footballer

Serbian surnames